Woodchuck, also known as a groundhog, is a rodent of the family Sciuridae.

Woodchuck may also refer to:
 Woodchuck Hard Cider, an alcoholic drink
 Junior Woodchucks, a boy scouts-like youth organization in Disney's fictional universe
 A person native-born in Vermont